Gerrit Oosting  (12 April 1941 in Zwartemeer – 15 November 2012 in Oldenzaal) was a Dutch politician.

Oosting started his career as a teacher in Oldenzaal. From 1978 to 1987 he was an alderman for the Labour Party (PvdA) in Oldenzaal. Subsequently he was mayor of Gieten from 1987 to 1997 and also mayor ad int. of Eelde from 1991 to 1992, succeedingly mayor ad int. of Ambt Delden from 1998 to 2001, and mayor ad int. of Vlagtwedde in 2009.

References 

1941 births
2012 deaths
Aldermen in Overijssel
Dutch educators
Labour Party (Netherlands) politicians
Mayors in Drenthe
People from Aa en Hunze
People from Emmen, Netherlands
People from Hof van Twente
People from Oldenzaal
People from Tynaarlo
People from Vlagtwedde
Mayors in Overijssel
Mayors in Groningen (province)